Abigail Agivanagi Tere-Apisah (born 13 July 1992) is a former professional tennis player from Papua New Guinea.

Tere-Apisah has a career-high WTA singles ranking of No. 276, achieved on 6 August 2018.
She is the daughter of Kwalam Apisah and Verenagi Tere. Her sister Marcia, and her nieces, Violet and Patricia Apisah, are also tennis players.

Tennis career
In 2010, Abigail graduated from Albury High School in Albury, Australia. She then attended Georgia State University, playing tennis for the Panthers, and graduated in 2014 with a BS in Health and Physical Education. Apisah is a two time All-American tennis player (2012 and 2014).

On 24 May 2014, Apisah reached the semifinals of the NCAA Championship, losing in the third-set tiebreak to Lynn Chi. She reached a collegiate national ranking of No. 8 in singles.

On 3 December 2017, in the Asia-Pacific Wildcard Playoff final for the 2018 Australian Open, she was looking to become the first player from Papua New Guinea to compete in a Grand Slam main draw, but lost the final match 6–4, 5–7, 4–6 to Wang Xinyu of China.

On 19 May 2019, Tere-Apisah became the first Pacific islander to win a professional tennis singles title beating Russian top seed, Valeria Savinykh, at a $25k event in Singapore.

ITF Circuit finals

Singles: 2 (1 title, 1 runner–up)

Doubles: 11 (6 titles, 5 runner–ups)

National representation

Fed Cup
Tere-Apisah made her Fed Cup debut for Pacific Oceania in 2015, while the team was competing in the Asia/Oceania Zone Group II.

Fed Cup (15–11)

Singles (10–5)

Doubles (5–6)

References

External links
 
 
 

1992 births
Living people
People from the National Capital District (Papua New Guinea)
Papua New Guinean female tennis players
Georgia State Panthers women's tennis players